Grace Episcopal Church is a historic church in Paducah, Kentucky.

The church is located at 820 Broadway in the historic centre of Paducah, close to the Lloyd Tilghman House and Civil War Museum.

A church has been on the site since 1846. The current building dates from 1873, the design of architect Henry Martyn Congdon, and was added to the National Register of Historic Buildings in 1976.

The church continues as an active centre of worship in the Diocese of Kentucky.

References

Episcopal church buildings in Kentucky
Churches on the National Register of Historic Places in Kentucky
Gothic Revival church buildings in Kentucky
Churches completed in 1873
19th-century Episcopal church buildings
Churches in McCracken County, Kentucky
Buildings and structures in Paducah, Kentucky
National Register of Historic Places in McCracken County, Kentucky
1873 establishments in Kentucky